Arthur Geoffrey Dickens  (6 July 1910 – 31 July 2001) was an English academic and author.

Early life
He was born in Hull, Yorkshire, on 6 July 1910, and educated at Magdalen College, Oxford.

Second World War
He served during World War II in the Royal Artillery.  From May to October 1945 he served with the military government in Lübeck, where he had to supervise and edit the local newspaper.

Academic career
In 1949, Dickens was appointed professor of history at the University of Hull, later becoming deputy principal and dean of the Faculty of Arts, 1950–53, and pro-vice-chancellor, 1959–62. He took up the post of professor of history at King's College London in 1962, where he remained until becoming director of the Institute of Historical Research (IHR) and professor of history in the University of London, 1967–77. Dickens was also active in other bodies, including being president of the Ecclesiastical History Society, 1966–68; a member of the Advisory Council on Public Records, 1968–76; an advisor to the Council on the Export of Works of Art, 1968–76; secretary, chairman and general secretary of the British National Committee of Historical Sciences, 1967–79; foreign secretary of the British Academy, 1969–79; and vice-president of the British Record Society, 1978–80. Dickens enjoyed "a deep love affair with Germany", was a moving force in the establishment of the German Historical Institute in London and was decorated by the German government.  He died in London at the age of 91.

His book on the English Reformation was, for many years the standard text on the subject, relying as it did on detailed examination of parish records.

He was elected a fellow of the British Academy in 1966.

Death and legacy
Papers of Professor Dickens are held by Senate House Library, University of London, and are available to be consulted there.

Selected publications
 Lübeck Diary. Victor Gollancz Ltd., London 1947
 The English Reformation, Batsford, 1964 
 Lollards and Protestants in the Diocese of York, 1959
 Thomas Cromwell and the English Reformation, 1959
 Reformation and Society in Sixteenth Century Europe, 1966
 Martin Luther and the Reformation, 1967
 The Counter Reformation, 1968
 The German Nation and Martin Luther, 1974
 The Age of Humanism and Reformation, 1977

References 

English non-fiction writers
Reformation historians
Fellows of the British Academy
Alumni of Magdalen College, Oxford
Academics of King's College London
Presidents of the Ecclesiastical History Society
1910 births
2001 deaths
Academics of the University of Hull
British Army personnel of World War II
Royal Artillery soldiers
Commanders Crosses of the Order of Merit of the Federal Republic of Germany
English male non-fiction writers
Anglican scholars
20th-century Anglicans
20th-century English male writers